PMSL may refer to:

 PMSL or pressure at mean sea level, an alternative term for mean sea level pressure
 Pissing myself laughing, Internet slang similar to LOL